Mykola Zhovtyuk (born 21 May 1992, in Novohrad-Volynskyi, Zhytomyr Oblast, Ukraine) is a Ukrainian professional footballer who plays as a defender for Polish IV liga club MKS Gogolin.

Zhovtyuk is the product of the UFK Lviv School System. He made his debut for FC Karpaty entering as a second-half substitute against FC Shakhtar Donetsk on 26 August 2012 in Ukrainian Premier League.

He also played for Ukrainian under-17 national football team and was called up for other age level representations.

References

External links

1992 births
Living people
Ukrainian footballers
Association football defenders
Ukraine youth international footballers
FC Karpaty Lviv players
FC Bukovyna Chernivtsi players
NK Veres Rivne players
FC Polissya Zhytomyr players
FC Krystal Kherson players
Ukrainian Premier League players
Ukrainian First League players
Ukrainian Second League players
IV liga players
Ukrainian expatriate footballers
Expatriate footballers in Poland
Ukrainian expatriate sportspeople in Poland